In India, St. James Church Puthenkadai is head church for Keshavapuram and Thetticode.

Puthenkadai location: District: Kanyakumari   and Taluk : kalkulam

Way to Reach
It is located in the state Highway between Marthantam & Pechipparai Road. And located at Puthenkatai village near to Aruvikkarai village

About The Village
This village contains red, black soil and clay-rich area of plants and trees naturally increases the beauty of the straight upright stand, The prosperity which is  rich in this wetland, dry prevailing in the region, and In this village Paralaiyarru water through the prosperity of the limited pearl green Appearance here.

Nearest Tourism
3 km from Mathoor THOTTIPPALAM
16 km from Tirparappu Falls,
Around 30 km from PECHIPPARAI DAM
1 km FROM Thiruvattar AdiKesava Perumal Kovil
5 km from Chitharal Malai kovil
1 km FROM Aruvikkarai

History
AD 16th century in the initial period of Christian regional work for the disciples in coastal areas and work bulk of the Christian religion, By the embracing of the Name "'Protector Of Fisher Men''', They considered the St. James as a Main god to worship.

The people Called "CHAVAKIZHAR" On set of terminating the daily works Build up The Small church which is  made up of sand. As the days pass over the number of Christians  increasing in the area a big society of Christianity made over in this society of groupism Village.

As By the info of this village initially after the standardity it has separated from the head Church of "Muzhagumoodu".

References

Sources
 St.James official site

Churches in Tamil Nadu